Lawrence Chimezie Akandu ( Lawrence, born 10 December 1974 in Nigeria) is a Nigerian-born Hong Kong football player who currently plays for Hoi Fan in the Campeonato da 1ª Divisão do Futebol.

Biography

Early career
Akandu started his career and made his name as a centre forward but has become a defender.

Akandu moved to Hong Kong from the Polish club Wisła Kraków in 1994. He played for Hong Kong First Division side Frankwell, Five-One-Seven, Tung Po.

In the summer of 2002, Akandu joined Hong Kong Second Division club Kitchee. As a physically powerful centre forward, he scored 15 goals in the 2002–03 season, helping Kitchee earn promotion to the Hong Kong First Division.

Happy Valley
In 2003–04 season, Akandu joined Happy Valley, one of the top team in Hong Kong First Division League. Despite lack of first division experience, he quickly adapted in the competition. He scored ten goals in the first-half season and led the Top Soccer table.

International career
In November 2003, Akandu acquired Hong Kong permanent resident status and played as a striker in the Hong Kong representative team. He scored on his debut for Hong Kong in the East Asian Football Championship 2003 against Korea Republic on 4 December 2003, where he scored the only goal for Hong Kong.

Honours
With Kitchee:
Hong Kong Second Division League: 2002–03

With Happy Valley:
Hong Kong Senior Shield: 2003–04
Hong Kong FA Cup: 2003–04

With Tung Po:
Hong Kong Junior Shield: 2005–06

With Shatin SA:
Hong Kong Junior Shield: 2007–08
Hong Kong Third Division League: 2007–08
Hong Kong Junior Shield: 2008–09
Hong Kong Second Division League: 2008–09

Career statistics

Club career
As of 14 November 2009

International career
As of 15 January 2007

Notes and references

1974 births
Living people
Hong Kong footballers
Hong Kong international footballers
Nigerian footballers
Nigerian emigrants to Hong Kong
Hong Kong people of Nigerian descent
People with acquired permanent residency of Hong Kong
Association football defenders
Association football forwards
Hong Kong First Division League players
Happy Valley AA players
Kitchee SC players
Shatin SA players
Tuen Mun SA players
Naturalized footballers of Hong Kong
Sportspeople from Benin City